Melissa Humana-Paredes (born October 10, 1992) is a Canadian beach volleyball player, who is partnered with Brandie Wilkerson. Humana-Paredes won the women's gold medal with 
Sarah Pavan at the 2019 Beach Volleyball World Championships.

Early life
Born in Toronto, Ontario, Humana-Paredes is the younger daughter of two Chilean expatriates, ballet dancer Myriam Paredes and volleyball player Hernán Humaña, who was part of the national team and later coached Canadians John Child and Mark Heese to the bronze medal at the 1996 Olympics. Humana-Paredes started playing beach volleyball at the age of 12 and four years later, was already representing Canada internationally. She also played competitive indoor volleyball for Storm Volleyball. She then attended York University, majoring in communications while playing CIS volleyball for the York Lions for four seasons from 2010 to 2014.

Volleyball career
In 2011, she won a silver medal at the FIVB Beach Volleyball U21 World Championships with Victoria Altomare. Years later, as Hernan talked with volleyball coach Garth Pischke, he learned his daughter Taylor wanted to join the beach volleyball scene and suggested that the two daughters be joined as a team. Both were trained by John Child. The new pair led Humana-Paredes to win the bronze medal at the World Under-23 Championships and be named the top female rookie in 2015 by the International Federation of Volleyball.

Humana-Paredes competed at several Grand Slam and World Cup events, reaching the round of 16 at the 2015 Beach Volleyball World Championships and the semi-finals at the 2015 Pan American Games. From August 23–28, 2016, she competed with Pischke at the Long Beach, California, Grand Slam. Playing in Pool-A, they lost to Maria Antonelli and Lili of Brazil (21–11, 23–21), and April Ross and Kerri Walsh Jennings of the United States (21–16, 21–17) in straight sets. Playing against Carol and Ana Patrícia of Brazil, they won in straight sets (21–19, 26–24), placing them in 3rd in Pool-A.

Humana-Paredes and Pavan won the gold medal at the 2019 Beach Volleyball World Championships, defeating the American team of April Ross and Alix Klineman in straight-sets 2-0 (23-21, 23-21); for Canada's first medal ever at the event. This victory automatically qualified the Canadian pair for the 2020 Olympics in Tokyo. They achieved further success on the FIVB tour that summer with additional tournament wins at the Edmonton Open in late July, and at the Vienna Major in early August. These FIVB tour wins were followed by success on the AVP tour, with additional championship wins over Ross and Klineman at both the Manhattan Beach Open in mid-August and the Hawaii Open in late September.

Humana-Paredes and Pavan were named to the Canadian Olympic team for the 2020 Summer Olympics in Tokyo, which the COVID-19 pandemic caused to be delayed until 2021. The two went undefeated during pool play, winning every set. Entering the knockout rounds as the top seed, they defeated Spaniards Liliana/Baquerizo in the Round of 16. In the quarter final, a rematch of the Commonwealth Games final with Australians Clancy/Artacho del Solar, they lost two sets to one and were eliminated from the tournament.

Accolades
 Champion, 2019 FIVB Beach Volleyball World Championships - Hamburg (representing Canada, with Sarah Pavan)
 Champion, 2019 FIVB Beach Volleyball World Tour Winner (representing Canada, with Sarah Pavan)
 FIVB Team of the Year 2019 (with Sarah Pavan)
 FIVB Best Defensive Player, 2019
 FIVB Best Setter, 2018 & 2019
 AVP Best Defensive Player, 2019
 AVP Newcomer of the Year, 2019
 FIVB Most Improved Player, 2017
 FIVB Top Rookie, 2014

University
2012-13 OUA First-Team All-star 
2011-12 OUA First-Team All-star 
2011-12 CIS Second Team All-Canadian
2012 York Lions Female Athlete of the Year

References

External links
 
 
 

1992 births
Living people
Canadian women's beach volleyball players
Pan American Games competitors for Canada
Beach volleyball players at the 2015 Pan American Games
York University alumni
York Lions volleyball players
Volleyball players from Toronto
Canadian people of Chilean descent
Beach volleyball players at the 2018 Commonwealth Games
Commonwealth Games gold medallists for Canada
Beach volleyball defenders
FIVB World Tour award winners
Commonwealth Games competitors for Canada
Beach volleyball players at the 2020 Summer Olympics
Beach volleyball players at the 2022 Commonwealth Games
Medallists at the 2022 Commonwealth Games